Jeanne Landre (29 December 1874-15 November 1936) was a French journalist, critic and novelist. A 1923 survey of French literature called her "the romancer of Montmartre and the modern disciple of a Mürger still more bohemian than the original".

Life
Jeanne Landre was born at Paris on 29 December 1874 and died in the 6th arrondissement of Paris on 15 November 1936.

Works
 Cri-cri, 1900
 Camelots du roi, 1900
 La gargouille: roman moderne, 1908
 Échalote et ses amants, roman de moeurs montmartroises, 1909
 Contes de Montmartre, 1910
 Échalote continue. Roman de moeurs montmartroises, 1910
 Gavarni, 1912
 Puis il mourut, 1916
 L'Ecole des marraines, 1917
 Loin des balles: mémoires d'un philanthrope, 1918
 Bob et Bobette, enfants perdus: roman, 1919
 Madame Poche: ou, La Parfaite éducatrice, 1919
 Où va l'amour (cahiers d'une bourgeoise), 1920
 Échalote, douairière: roman, 1925
 Mlle de Rivère, institutrice, 1926
 La parodie galante: roman, 1928
 Aristide Bruant, 1930
 Les Soliloques du pauvre de Jehan Rictus, 1930
 Nouvelles Aventures d'Échalote, 1932
 L'idole du beau sexe, le marquis de Létorière'', 1938

References

1874 births
1936 deaths
French journalists
French women journalists
French literary critics
Women literary critics
French women critics
French novelists
French women novelists